The City of Doncaster is a metropolitan borough with city status in South Yorkshire, England. It is named after its principal settlement, Doncaster, and includes the surrounding suburbs of Doncaster as well as numerous towns and villages.

The largest settlement in the borough are Doncaster itself, followed by the towns of Thorne, Hatfield and Mexborough (the latter of which is part of the Barnsley/Dearne Valley built-up area), and it additionally covers the towns of Conisbrough, Stainforth, Bawtry, Askern, Edlington and Tickhill.

Doncaster borders the Selby district of North Yorkshire to the north, the East Riding of Yorkshire to the north-east, North Lincolnshire to the east, Bassetlaw in Nottinghamshire to the south-east, Rotherham to the south-west, Barnsley to the west, and Wakefield, West Yorkshire, to the north-west. It is part of the Yorkshire and the Humber region.

The borough was created on 1 April 1974, under the Local Government Act 1972, as a merger of the former County Borough of Doncaster, the urban districts of Adwick-le-Street, Bentley with Arksey, Conisbrough, Mexborough, and Tickhill, Doncaster and Thorne rural districts, and the parish of Finningley from East Retford Rural District and small parts of the parish of Harworth from Worksop Rural District from Nottinghamshire.

Population statistics

According to the 2011 census, the population of the Metropolitan Borough of Doncaster is 302,400.

With approximately 110,000 inhabitants, the town of Doncaster itself contains around a third of the population of the entire borough. Around half of the borough's population reside within Doncaster's urban area (approximately 160,000).

Verified population statistics per Ward from the 2001 census are shown as

Elected mayor
A referendum was held in 2001, to decide if a directly elected mayor should be appointed. The first mayor, Martin Winter, representing the Labour Party, was elected in 2002 and successfully defended his post in 2005.

In 2009 the English Democrat candidate, Peter Davies, won the election for mayor. In January 2013 Davies left the English Democrats citing "a big influx of new members (of the English Democrats) joining from the British National Party". In the May 2013 mayoral election he was defeated by Labour's Ros Jones.

Borough council
The council as a whole has been dominated by the Labour Party traditionally, but in the 2004 local elections, they lost overall control of the council (though they retained more councillors than any other single party). Labour regained overall control at the 2010 local elections.

2010 Audit Commission report and central government intervention
In January 2010, the Audit Commission initiated a corporate governance inspection of Doncaster Council. This followed the sudden resignation of the Chief executive leading to a conflict between the mayor and council over the appointment of a successor. The Commission felt that this, along with evidence that the council had not been well run for 15 years, was leading to a loss of public confidence.

The Commission's report was issued in April 2010. It found that Doncaster was a dysfunctional authority and that there were three factors preventing the council from providing good governance:
The councillors' attempts to undermine the authority of the mayor and cabinet. There was evidence that councillors had never accepted the mayoral system and tried to use their overview and scrutiny powers to frustrate the mayor's policy objectives. In February 2010, the council had rejected the mayor's budget and voted in favour of their own proposals.
The lack of effective leadership shown by the mayor and cabinet. The mayor was described as "not averse to provocative and inflammatory statements" and it was felt that he "does not always act in a way which demonstrates the need for an elected mayor to lead his authority and represent all the people in Doncaster".
The failure of chief officers to deliver effectively services. Some senior officers were found to acquiesce in the councillors' misuse of scrutiny powers. There was also a lack of trust and impartiality.

On the recommendations of the commission, the Secretary of State for Communities and Local Government, John Denham, used powers to appoint an acting chief executive and an advisory board to oversee the council. A Doncaster Recovery Board, comprising four appointed commissioners and seven other members including the mayor and chief executive held its first quarterly meeting on 10 September 2010.

Places
Settlements in the Borough of Doncaster include:

Adwick-le-Street, Almholme, Arksey, Armthorpe, Askern, Auckley, Austerfield
Balby, Barnburgh, Barnby Dun, Bawtry, Belle Vue, Bentley, Bessacarr, Blaxton, Braithwaite, Braithwell, Branton, Brodsworth, Burghwallis
Cadeby, Campsall, Cantley, Carcroft, Clayton, Clifton, Conisbrough, Cusworth
Denaby, Doncaster, Dunscroft, Dunsville
Edenthorpe, Edlington
Fenwick, Finningley, Fishlake
Hampole, Harlington, Hatfield, Hatfield Woodhouse, Hayfield, Haywood, Hexthorpe, Highfields, Hickleton, High Levels, High Melton, Hooton Pagnell, Hyde Park
Intake
Kirk Sandall, Kirk Bramwith
Lakeside, Lindholme, Loversall
Marr, Mexborough, Micklebring, Moorends, Moss
New Rossington, Norton
Owston
Rossington
Scawsby, Scawthorpe, Shaftholme, Skelbrooke, Skellow, Sprotbrough, Stainforth, Stainton, South Yorkshire, Sykehouse
Thorne, Thorpe in Balne, Tickhill, Tilts, Toll Bar, Town Moor
Wadworth, Warmsworth, West Bessacarr, Wheatley, Wheatley Hills, Woodlands

Media

Radio stations that can be received in Doncaster are Sine FM 102.6 (serving central districts of around 100,000 households in FM stereo), TMCR 95.3 (which serves Northeast Doncaster and other areas in FM stereo), TX1 Radio (covering Doncaster and Bassetlaw), Capital Yorkshire, Heart Yorkshire, Greatest Hits Radio Yorkshire, Hallam FM and BBC Radio Sheffield, although numerous stations from Sheffield, Leeds, Hull, York, Lincoln and other cities can be received. Although the above stations can be received within various areas of Doncaster, the only stations actually owned by Doncaster-based companies are Sine FM 102.6 and TMCR 95.3.

The borough is also the base of Nova Productions who produce the syndicated TV series Walks Around Britain.

Freedom of the Borough
The following people and military units have received the Freedom of the Borough of Doncaster.

Individuals
 8 July 1751: Viscount Downe, British Politician.
 8 July 1751: Lord Rockingham, British Prime Minister. 
 8 July 1751: Lord Granby, British Army Officer.
 23 September 1806: Prince of Wales.
 23 September 1806: Duke of Clarence.
 17 September 1822: Duke of Sussex
 15 September 1829: FM Duke of Wellington, British Army Officer and Later Prime Minister.
 14 August 2017: Lance Bombardier Ben Parkinson, British Paratrooper wounded in Afghanistan. 
 25 February 2019: Tony Sockett, Former Mayor of Doncaster.
 22 March 2019: Yvonne Woodcock, Mayor of Doncaster 1998-1999.
 22 March 2022: James Coppinger, Footballer for Doncaster Rovers 2004-2021.

Military Units
 The King's Own Yorkshire Light Infantry: 1945.
 RAF Finningley: 1975.
 The Rifles: 8 September 2007.
 The Coldstream Guards: 15 July 2021.

References

External links

Doncaster College
Doncaster Belles L.F.C. homepage
Doncaster Rovers F.C. homepage
StadiumWatch homepage
 Doncaster Sheffield Airport
Doncaster Lakeside

 
Local government districts in South Yorkshire
Metropolitan boroughs
Politics of Doncaster
1974 establishments in England